KCPW-FM (88.3 MHz) is a public radio station in Salt Lake City, Utah.  It airs local news and music programming, as well as network shows from American Public Media, Public Radio International, the Canadian Broadcasting Corporation and the BBC.  It broadcasts from studios at the Salt Lake City Public Library in Downtown Salt Lake City at Library Square.

KCPW-FM is owned by Wasatch Public Media.  Its previous transmitter was located atop the Wells Fargo Center in downtown Salt Lake City for much of its history. It is currently located in the Oquirrh Mountains Range southwest of West Valley City. The 88.3 FM frequency does not broadcast in stereo audio, to improve reception in marginal signal areas.  Due to other stations on 88.3 FM and adjacent frequencies in nearby cities, KCPW-FM has an effective radiated power of 450 watts.  It cannot use as much power as most of the other Salt Lake City FM stations.

History
On August 9, 1991, Community Wireless of Park City, Inc., received a construction permit to build a new FM non-commercial station in Salt Lake City from the Federal Communications Commission.  The FCC assigned it the call sign KBQA. Community Wireless already had an FM station on 91.9 MHz in Park City, Utah, a ski resort community about 50 miles east of Salt Lake City.  It later added other stations around Utah simulcasting its programming.   On November 1, 1992, the Salt Lake City station officially signed on the air, with the new call letters KCPW-FM.

In 2005, Community Wireless acquired an AM radio station licensed to Tooele, Utah, at 1010 kHz, which also took the call sign KCPW.  The AM station is powered in the daytime at 50,000 watts, giving the station a much wider coverage area.  But in January 2008, Community Wireless decided to sell the 1010 AM frequency.  Programming was switched to airing the BBC World Service around the clock until a Catholic organization agreed to acquire the station for religious programming.

On March 28, 2008, Wasatch Public Media signed a letter of intent to purchase KCPW-FM. A sales contract was signed in June 2008.  Had this not occurred, KCPW-FM would have instead been sold to the Educational Media Foundation for a national Christian contemporary format. KCPW's AM 1010 facility was separately sold to Immaculate Heart Radio.  It became KIHU that August.

KCPW-FM ended its longtime National Public Radio (NPR) membership on June 24, 2013, allowing the station to reduce expenses as well as decrease duplication with the area's primary NPR network affiliate, 90.1 KUER-FM. KCPW continues to carry national programming supplied by Public Radio International, American Public Media, the Canadian Broadcasting Corporation and the BBC.  The station also continues to produce its local programming. In June 2014, the station announced that it would need to raise $42,000 by July 3 in order to pay for its American Public Media programming; if the goal was not met, KCPW would have closed down and the money donated during the fund drive would be returned to the contributors. The goal was reached on July 2, 2014.

Local Programs
On Fridays at 9 a.m., KCPW airs Behind The Headlines, hosted by Roger McDonough, featuring reporters from the Salt Lake Tribune.  It is rebroadcast on Sunday at 10 a.m.  On Wednesdays at 10 a.m., The Hinckley Institute Radio Hour is heard, hosted by Christian Camargo.  It deals with local and national issues and politics, in cooperation with the Hinckley Institute of Politics.  On Sunday evenings from 6 to 10 p.m., KCPW airs "Jazz Time" hosted by Steve Williams, a 35-year veteran of public radio.

In the past, KCPW-FM produced two local affairs programs, Midday Utah (shared with sister station KPCW) and Midday Metro. Midday Utah was hosted by Blair Feulner and covered topics of statewide and regional interest. Midday Metro, later renamed The Public Square, was hosted and produced by Lara Jones and covered topics of interest in the Salt Lake Valley.  Former Salt Lake City Mayor Rocky Anderson was an occasional guest host on Midday Metro.

References

External links
KCPW-FM website
KCPW-FM's Politics Up Close

CPW-FM
Mass media in Salt Lake City
Radio stations established in 1994
1994 establishments in Utah